Ragnhild Nilstun  (born 31 January 1943) is a Norwegian novelist, children's writer and literary critic.

She was born in Lofoten, is a philologist by education, and has worked at the University of Tromsø. She made her literary debut in 1979 with the novel Etterbyrden, with descriptions of postnatal depression. The novel was also adapted for theatre and staged at Fjernsynsteatret. In 1988 she published the short story collection Begjærets pris. The novel For mitt blikk (1996) depicts life in Finnmark and Troms in the late nineteenth century, and is the first in a trilogy which also includes For kjærlighets skyld (2002), and Min lange reise ender her (2007). Her children's books have been translated into several languages.

References

1943 births
Living people
People from Lofoten
Norwegian novelists
Norwegian literary critics
Norwegian women critics
Women literary critics
Norwegian women non-fiction writers
Norwegian children's writers
Norwegian women children's writers
20th-century Norwegian women writers
21st-century Norwegian women writers
Academic staff of the University of Tromsø